Avsalon's Drinking Horn, named for Bishop Absalon due to an incorrect tradition that he was its first owner, is a 72 cm long 14th-century drinking horn, with silver mountings, two of which were added in the 15th and early 16th centuries, now in the collection of the National Museum of Denmark.

History
The drinking horn dates from the 14th century and comes from the Cistercian Sorø Abbey. The incorrect tradition that it has belonged to Bishop Absalon may come from Henrik Tornekrans, its last Catholic abbot. It is first mentioned in the records of the Royal Danish Treasury in 1696. In 1845, it was transferred to the new National Museum of Denmark.

Description

The horn is from European bison and its length measures 72.2 cm with a diameter is 15.5 cm. The silver mount of the rim  measures 5 cm and is without ornamentation. Below it is an engraved frieze from the beginning of the 16th century with the coat of arms of the Tornekrans. Below the trim mount is also an escutcheon coat of arms from around 1400, depicting an abbot in a stylized garden. There are traces of a now-lost silver mount on the tip of the horn. On a drawing from 1696 of "Absalons belongings" (Sorø), it can be seen with the tip fixture still there.

See also
 Oldenburg Horn

References

Firther reading
 Etting, Vivian: The Story of the Drinking Horn - Drinking Culture in Scandinavia during the Middle Ages,Syddansk Universitetsforlag, 2013.

Xxternal links

 Source
 Source

Medieval European objects in the National Museum of Denmark
14th-century works
Drinkware
Drinking horns